Louis Fouché (born 21 March 1970) is a retired South African javelin thrower.

He won the gold medal at the 1993 Summer Universiade, the bronze medal at the 1993 African Championships, finished fifth at the 1994 World Cup, fifth at the 1994 Commonwealth Games, won the bronze medal at the 1995 All-Africa Games, and the silver medal at the 1996 African Championships,

His personal best throw was 79.64 metres, achieved at the 1993 Summer Universiade in Buffalo.

References

1970 births
Living people
South African male javelin throwers
Commonwealth Games competitors for South Africa
Athletes (track and field) at the 1994 Commonwealth Games
African Games bronze medalists for South Africa
Athletes (track and field) at the 1995 All-Africa Games
African Games medalists in athletics (track and field)
Universiade medalists in athletics (track and field)
Universiade gold medalists for South Africa
Medalists at the 1993 Summer Universiade
20th-century South African people
21st-century South African people